The Volvo 300 Series is a rear-wheel-drive small family car sold from 1976 to 1991, both as a hatchback and (from 1984) as a  conventional notchback saloon.

It was launched in the Netherlands shortly after Volvo acquired a major stake in the passenger car division of DAF in 1973. The series consisted of the Volvo 340 (previously 343/345) and the later Volvo 360.



Origins

After building a series of compact cars, DAF sought a partner to bring its new larger model, codenamed P900, and intended to become the DAF 77, to market in 1970. Several manufacturers were approached, including Audi, BMW, and Volvo.

Volvo was not originally interested due to the cost, but they were later persuaded by DAF's access to Renault engines. This helped Volvo expand its model line-up without the large expenditures associated with developing a new model. Building cars in the Netherlands also helped the Swedish Volvo to access the markets of the EEC, of which Sweden was then not yet a member.

Volvo purchased a one-third share in DAF in 1973, increasing to a three-quarters stake in 1975; the DAF company's name was changed to Volvo Car BV that year. Free of its passenger car division, DAF's commercial vehicle division, DAF Trucks, still operates today, owned by Paccar since 1996.

Design
DAF had begun the development of this car in 1970 as Project P900, meant as a replacement for the DAF 66 and due to launch in 1975, probably as DAF 77. In 1971 four designs were presented anonymously to DAF employees, one by Bertone, one by Michelotti and two by DAF in-house designers. The design by DAF's designer John de Vries (who would later win a similar contest for the Volvo 480 design) was chosen. In 1972 Volvo bought a stake in DAF, followed by a takeover in 1975, and the design was gradually adapted to Volvo's own standards, though there were a lot of quality concerns.

The 300 series was unusual in having the gearbox mounted to the De Dion tube rear axle as a transaxle, with the 2 L models having the driveshaft enclosed in a "torque tube". The rear-mounted gearbox helped with weight distribution, but resulted in an unusually large transmission tunnel, especially by comparison with the contemporary front-wheel drive competitors such as the Mk. III Ford Escort and the Opel Kadett E/Mk. II Vauxhall Astra.

Overall, the 300 series was considered heavy and often underpowered, but reliable and safe by the standards of its day. However, the 360 GLT versions were well regarded by more enthusiastic drivers, with the unusual gearbox location ensuring good weight distribution and unusually good balance and traction. The fuel tank was located ahead of the rear axle, straddling the rear-mounted transmission, the safest possible location and one that ensured consistent handling characteristics whether the tank is full or empty.

Model chronology

The Volvo 343 was introduced on 19 February 1976. The introduction model was fitted with a  1.4 L Renault Cléon-Fonte engine in the front and DAF's radical Variomatic continuously variable transmission unusually mounted in the rear, helping weight distribution. The engine was an enlarged version of those already fitted to the DAF 55 and 66. To add to the appeal of the car and boost its sales, Volvo adapted the M45 manual transmission from the 200 series to fit in place of the CVT, and was sold alongside the CVT models from 1979. A five-door model, the 345, was added in August 1979 for the 1980 model year. The extra doors added ; other modifications included better brakes, a slightly larger track due to wider wheels, and interval wipers. During 1980 larger wrap-around bumpers were introduced. In 1981 another engine option was added to the range, the Volvo designed B19, only available in GLS-specs with the manual transmission.

A facelift in summer 1981 for the 1982 model year featured a revised bonnet, grille, front lamp arrangement, and slightly different fenders. The interior was revised and the cars received a new dashboard that was more aligned with those of other Volvo models.

The third digit designating the number of doors was dropped from model designations in model year 1983, when the rear seat also gained a little bit more space thanks to a shallower seat pad and a flatter plate beneath it. The more powerful 360 arrived that year with two 2.0 litre engine choices, Volvo's own  B19A (360 GLS) and the fuel injected  B19E. The B19A was also available in the 340 DL. The more powerful 360 GLT was only available with a five-speed manual and the engine came equipped with a breakerless ignition system and velour interior, amongst other comfort details. The 360 GLT can be recognized by its front spoiler with integrated extra lights, a rear spoiler, and by being  lower. The 360s were four-cylinders and not sixes as implied by the name; the "360" name was used to "give the new model a stronger profile in the Volvo range." This 2-litre 360 model was available in five-door and three-door hatchback form, with four-door "notchback" saloon models added in 1984. Trim levels were GL, GLE, or GLT, depending on output and specifications.

In 1985, the 300 Series received a major facelift. Amongst other small changes, (optionally body-colored) wrap-around bumpers with the indicator repeaters attached to them were fitted. The taillights were also redesigned. Instrumentation changed from Smiths units to VDO. The older Volvo redblock engines in the 360 were upgraded to the low friction B200 unit. Capacities and outputs remained much the same. The carburettor version was designated B200K and the Bosch LE-Jet fuel-injected version is known as the B200E.

A famous advertisement for the 300 series in the late 1980s saw a crash test dummy "come alive", and drive a 340 out of a second-floor factory window, nose-diving into the concrete ground.

From 1987 on, incremental improvements in features and emissions control were made. The newly designed power steering from the new Volvo 480 became available as an option for the 1988 model year, while rust protection was improved with the increased use of galvanized steel. Production of the 360 came to an end in 1990, while the 340 was discontinued in 1991, despite the fact it had supposedly been replaced by the Volvo 440 in 1987. The last ever car of the Volvo 300 series (a white Volvo 340) rolled off the production line on 13 March 1991, three years after the launch of the 400-series.

Engines
The 300 Series had a choice of three petrol engines; a 1.4, 1.7, and a 2.0-litre. A new Renault F-series  1.7 litre petrol engine (designated the B172) was introduced in the 340 during the summer of 1985, following the range facelift, along with a 340 version of the saloon, which was only available with the new engine.

A diesel engine for the 340 developing , was only available in select export markets and was added to the 340 models in 1984. This diesel was a Renault F-series (like the petrol 1.7), and was available with a 1.6 L naturally aspirated engine only - called the "D16" in Volvo's internal parlance. While these diesel models were never offered in the UK, they were offered in right-hand drive form in Ireland. In 1985 a 360 diesel was made available with the same exact mechanics. The diesel was discontinued in 1989, which is when a 1.3 L "tax special" was introduced for Finland, Italy, and Belgium. Volvo also experimented with LPG tanks, a feature available in 1979 with the Volvo 343 and 345, but they were limited in LPG availability.

Sales

The 300-series was a strong seller for Volvo. Sales began at a low level, not helped by the absence of a manual transmission option and an early reputation for poor build quality, but sales gradually increased as the lineup expanded with manual transmission and a 5-door body style, and the initial quality issues were solved - by redesigning the interior and dashboard. 300-series cumulative production broke the 100,000 barrier on 12 December 1983, with the total reaching 102,000 before the end of the year. The 100,000th car, finished in white, was donated to the Dutch Red Cross.

In 1988, 12 years after its introduction, the one-millionth 300 was built. Finished inside and out in red, it ended up in the DAF museum in Eindhoven. Eventually, the production of the 300 series ended in 1991 after 1.14 million units, averaging 76,000 vehicles per year throughout its life.

While the car was fundamentally robust, the car was rushed to production too early. In particular the first (1976) model year 343 suffered from teething problems, with unsubstantiated claims that Volvo ordered its dealer network to scrap early model year cars that were traded in, in order to remove them from circulation.  As a result very few of the earliest 1976-77 cars have survived. The build quality gradually improved but was never up to the same standard as Volvo's larger models. Due to this bad reputation, the car was not popular in Sweden. Sales of the 340 with Variomatic in Sweden were down to 200 per year in the late 1980s. The 300's sales were also limited because the price of a two-litre 360 was more than a base 240 in the home market.

Markets
Whilst not a major sales success, the Volvo badge ensured that the car had a strong middle-class following (often as a second car) in some places, particularly in the UK in the 1980s. It regularly made it onto Britain's top annual 20 sales tables for that decade and was the best selling import car at several points in the early years of the decade. They are robust and mechanically simple (and therefore easy to maintain). Variomatic transmissions are reliable given proper care. The rust protection was poorer than other Volvos, but the engines were durable. In February 2016, it was reported that 627 examples of the 300 Series were still in use on Britain's roads.

Up to 1982, sales of the 300-series was almost entirely limited to Western Europe. In the years following, export to other parts of the world was slowly expanded with 4% of total sales in 1984.
In 1985, CKD-kits of the Volvo 340 GL were sent to Indonesia and CKD-kits of the Volvo 360 GLE were sent to Malaysia for assembly.

The 300-series was not sold in North America. The Volvo 360GLT only was introduced in Australia and New Zealand during 1984 and continued until 1988.

Models and special editions
The 300 series was available in different trim levels throughout its production. There were also special editions.

Phase 1 343s and 345s were available in DL, GL, DLS, and GLS trim levels, whilst Phase 2 and 3 340s and 360s were available in the following range of trim levels: 340; 340DL; 340GL; 340GLE; 340 DLS; 340GLS; 340 Blueline; 340 Redline; 360; 360GL; 360DLS; 360GLS; 360GLE; 360GLT. No market received all models.

One such variation on a theme was the 1981 343 R-Sport. This was intended as a sporty offering to the line-up, pre-dating the introduction of the 360GLT by some two years. Only 100 cars were produced based on the DLS and GLS trim levels and featuring sporting additions such as self-adhesive 'R-Sport' decals, rev counter, front and rear spoilers as well as some featuring body-coloured bumpers and alloy wheels. The B19A engine also featured some modifications, including twin Solex carburetors. Power was increased from a quoted 95HP to 122HP (90 kW).

A similar model was the 1979 343 Oettinger. This model was based on the standard 343 DL, with the 1397 cc capacity increased to 1596 cc. It was modified by the VW Group tuning company Oettinger and released in 1979. The 343 Oettinger was available in red or silver metallic. A total of 125 cars were produced.

A van version also entered production. The van was essentially a five-door 340, but with the rear doors replaced with full body-coloured metal pieces and with the rear seats removed. A glazed version was also available. The  cargo compartment has a flat floor and a metal bulkhead behind the front seats to protect occupants from moving loads. It was called "Volvo 345 Van" and was developed for commercial use at the behest of the Dutch Postal Services, who preferred a Dutch-made vehicle. It was first presented at a commercial vehicle show in Amsterdam in February 1982 and was also offered to the public. The only engine was the petrol B14, combined with either the CVT or a four-speed manual.

The Millionaire edition was introduced in 1988 to commemorate the production of the one-millionth car in the 300 series. Available on both the 340GLE and 360 GLE/T, the Millionaire featured all options including air conditioning, electric front windows and mirrors, alloy wheels, and leather interior.

Prototypes

There are variations of the Volvo 300 series that never made production:

The Volvo 340 estate and a convertible were both built as design studies, but neither was put into production. The convertible version of the Volvo 340 was mooted, but only exists as a clay model.

The 363 CS was short for 'Competition Services', to indicate a high-performance version. The 1977 363 CS was based on the three-door bodyshell and fitted with the B27F 2.7 L V6 PRV engine as used in the Volvo 260 series. The gearbox was a five-speed Alfa Romeo unit, as Volvo did not have a suitable design which would fit a transaxle-design. One prototype was built which was painted in metallic silver with black and orange 'Starsky and Hutch'-style stripes down both sides. Flared wheelarches and orange-painted, multi-spoke alloy wheels were also added to complete the sporty look.

At the 1979 Geneva Motor Show, Bertone presented a three-door hatchback coupé concept on 343-basis called the Volvo Tundra. The angular design was by Marcello Gandini and continued the themes developed for the Reliant (Anadol) FW11.

In motorsport
The 300-series was campaigned in motorsport. A heavily modified version using Alpine/Gordini cross-flow engines bored out to 1770 cc was driven by Per-Inge Walfridsson to win the European Championship of Rallycross in 1980. The cars gained homologation for rallying in Sweden's Standard-B class (minimum weight of 15 kg/ps) in the spring of 1977, with some minor modifications to the engine and gearing. In the UK, several Volvo 360 GLT models can be seen in action on Road-Rally events.

The Volvo 360 GLT also participated in a 24-hour endurance record-breaking run at the Surfers Paradise raceway in Queensland, Australia to showcase the introduction of the model in Australia in 1984. This exact same Volvo 360 GLT was later converted to rallying specifications and participated in many Australia rally events and is still running in 2009 as a rally car.

References

 

340
Compact cars
Vehicles with CVT transmission
Rear-wheel-drive vehicles
Cars introduced in 1976
1980s cars
1990s cars
VDL Nedcar vehicles
Volvo 340
Hatchbacks